Dávid Jakab (born 21 May 1993) is a Hungarian football player who plays for Dunaújváros.

Club statistics

Updated to games played as of 2 December 2014.

References

HLSZ

1993 births
Living people
Footballers from Budapest
Hungarian footballers
Association football midfielders
Dunaújváros PASE players
MTK Budapest FC players
Zalaegerszegi TE players
Győri ETO FC players
Mosonmagyaróvári TE 1904 footballers
Kecskeméti TE players
Nemzeti Bajnokság I players
Nemzeti Bajnokság II players
Nemzeti Bajnokság III players